Toomas is an Estonian masculine given name, a cognate of Thomas.

People named Toomas include:
Toomas Alatalu (born 1942), historian, educator, political commentator and politician
Toomas Altnurme (born 1973), painter
Toomas Annus (born 1960), entrepreneur
Toomas Frey (born 1937), ecologist, geobotanist and forest scientist
Toomas Heikkinen (born 1991), Finnish rallycross driver
Toomas Helin (born 1966), drug smuggler
Toomas Hussar (born 1962), actor, film and theatre director and dramaturge
Toomas Hendrik Ilves (born 1953), politician, President of Estonia
Toomas Järveoja (born 1961), Estonian politician
Toomas Jürgenstein (born 1964), educator and politician
Toomas Kall (born 1947),  humorist, caricaturist, writer, screenwriter and translator
Toomas Kallaste (born 1971), football player
Toomas Kandimaa (born 1975), basketball player and coach
Toomas Kivimägi (born 1963), politician and lawyer
Toomas Kivisild (born 1969), geneticist
Toomas Kork (born 1945), social activist, businessman and politician
Toomas Krõm (born 1971), football player
Toomas Kukk (born 1971), botanist
Toomas Leius (born 1941), tennis player
Toomas Liivak (born 1970), basketball player
Toomas Merila (born 1939), track and field athlete and coach
Toomas Napa (born 1953), racing driver
Toomas Paur (born 1949), politician
Toomas Proovel (born 1973), wrestler
Toomas Raadik (born 1990), basketball player
Toomas Raudam (born 1947), writer
Toomas Savi (born 1942), politician
Toomas Sildmäe (born 1959), entrepreneur, politician, motorsportsman and sportsman
Toomas Sulling (born 1940), surgeon 
Toomas Tammaru (born 1968), lepidopterist and professor of entomology 
Toomas Tarm (born 1968), marathon runner
Toomas Tohver (born 1973), football goalkeeper
Toomas Tõnise (born 1952), modern pentathlete
Toomas Tõniste (born 1967), sailor and a politician
Toomas Triisa (born 1982), Estonian rally driver
Toomas Turb (born 1957), competitive runner
Toomas Uba (1943–2000), sports journalist
Toomas Urb (born 1958), actor and singer
Toomas Väinaste (born 1950), politician
Toomas Varek (born on 1948), politician
Toomas Vilosius (born 1951), politician
Toomas Vilpart (born 1971), rower
Toomas Vint (born 1944), painter and writer
Toomas Vitsut (born 1960), politician
Toomas Voll (born 1958), composer, conductor and choir director

Fictional characters
Toomas Nipernaadi, main character from August Gailit's 1929 novel Toomas Nipernaadi.

References

Estonian masculine given names